Isabel Ruth Trouncer (born 9 September 1930) is a British stage, film and television actress. During the late 1950s she had a recurring role on the television series The Larkins.

She is the daughter of the actor Cecil Trouncer.

Selected filmography

Television
 The Larkins (1958–60)
 The Human Jungle (1964)
 No Hiding Place (1965)
 Gideon's Way (1966)
 Adam Adamant Lives! (1966)
 The Avengers (1967)
 Poldark (1975)
 Wilde Alliance (1978)
 We, the Accused (1980)
 Strangers and Brothers (1984)

Films
 No Smoking (1955)
 Small Hotel (1957)
 The Family Way (1966)
 The Man Who Haunted Himself (1970)
 The Man Who Had Power Over Women (1970)
 There's a Girl in My Soup (1970)

References

Bibliography
 Tise Vahimagi & Michael Grade. British television: an illustrated guide. Oxford University Press, 1996.

External links

1930 births
Living people
British film actresses
British television actresses
British stage actresses
Actresses from London